Simon Lee Rodger (born 3 October 1971) is an English former professional footballer who played as a defensive midfielder from 1989 until 2004.

He played the majority of his career with Crystal Palace, including a number of seasons in the Premier League. He also played in the Football League for Manchester City, Stoke City and Brighton & Hove Albion, and in non-league football for Bognor Regis Town and Woking.

Club career
Rodger was born in Shoreham-by-Sea and played non-league football with Bognor Regis Town before he was signed by Palace in 1990 for £1,000. He made his debut for the club, away at Sheffield Wednesday, at the age of 20 and soon established himself as a vital member of the first team at Selhurst Park. He spent 11 seasons with Palace in what was a decade of instability at the club. They were founding members of the Premier League but were relegated back to Division One in 1992–93. They gained an instant return in 1993–94 which was followed again by relegation in 1994–95.

Promotion was again achieved in 1996–97 through the play-offs, but Rodger spent time out on loan that season at Manchester City (making eight appearances) and Stoke City (making five appearances). Palace then suffered a third relegation from the top-tier in 1997–98. Palace remained in Division One and with Rodger having spent ten years at the club he was given a testimonial against Tottenham Hotspur. In 2002, after his testimonial, Rodger was released by the club and after a short time with Woking, was signed by Brighton and Hove Albion, where he was reunited with former Palace manager Steve Coppell. He finished his League career with Brighton.

Personal life
Rodger is currently married to a QVC beauty expert presenter – Alison Young.

Career statistics
Source:

A.  The "Other" column constitutes appearances and goals in the Anglo-Italian Cup, Football League play-offs, Full Members Cup, Football League Trophy and UEFA Intertoto Cup.

References

External links
 

1971 births
Living people
English footballers
Bognor Regis Town F.C. players
Crystal Palace F.C. players
Manchester City F.C. players
Stoke City F.C. players
Woking F.C. players
Brighton & Hove Albion F.C. players
Premier League players
English Football League players
People from Shoreham-by-Sea
Association football midfielders
National League (English football) players